Manuel Mogato is a Filipino Pulitzer Prize-winning journalist and the editor-at-large of independent news website PressONE.ph. Concurrently, he serves as the defense editor of One News, a television news channel under Cignal TV.

Career
Graduating from the Pamantasan ng Lungsod ng Maynila in 1983, Mogato began his journalistic career as a crime, military, and political reporter for local newspapers. For example, he was the graveyard shift police reporter for People's Journal Tonight and later for the revived Manila Ties under Chino Roces until April 1986. He covered the defense and military establishments for the defunct Manila Chronicle during the turbulent years of Corazon "Cory" Aquino government. He was also the assistant news editor for the Manila Times when the newspaper was run by the Gokongwei family for ten years up to 1999 when it was sold due to political pressure from the government of Joseph Estrada. He had also worked for the Japanese newspaper Asahi Shimbun for a total of seven years covering politics, security, and diplomacy before he moved to Reuters in 2003.

He reported on the downfall of dictator Ferdinand Marcos and the People Power Revolution in 1986,  the successful bid for the presidency of  Fidel V. Ramos in 1992, numerous failed coups from the late 1980s until early 2000s, and the ouster of Joseph Estrada in 2001, among other important news. Also he wrote about  disasters and humanitarian crises including the Luzon earthquake in 1990 and the  eruption of Mount Pinatubo in 1991.

Reporting for Reuters as a political and general news Manila-based correspondent  since 2003, Mogato has traveled across Southeast Asia covering APEC and ASEAN Summits, the occupation of  Marawi by pro-Islamic militants, typhoon Haiyan, regional pandemics, and other topics. In addition to being a journalist, he started teaching basic newswriting and editorial writing at Pamantasan ng Lungsod ng Maynila as a part-time lecturer in 2011. 

In 2019, Mogato left Reuters to become the defense and diplomacy editor at cable TV news channel, Cignal TV's One News.

Awards
The work of the journalist is highly appreciated by the professional and political community. During his career he was awarded the Human Rights Press Awards; a Marshall McLuhan fellowship; two awards from the London-based Amnesty International Media Awards. His work was also noted by Overseas Press Club in 1979,  Society of Publishers in Asia in 2013, Union of Catholic Asian News, and the Rotary Club of Manila.

Mogato, alongside two other Reuters journalists Clare Baldwin and Andrew Marshall, won a Pulitzer Prize for International Reporting in 2018. Colleagues were recognized for exposing "the brutal killing campaign behind Philippines President Rodrigo Duterte’s war on drugs." Mogato is the second Manila-based Filipino journalist and the seventh Filipino to win a Pulitzer. His award  was welcomed as a significant achievement by former president Fidel V. Ramos formally congratulated Mogato with a congratulatory note.

References

Living people
Pulitzer Prize for International Reporting winners
21st-century journalists
Reuters people
Year of birth missing (living people)
Filipino journalists
Pamantasan ng Lungsod ng Maynila alumni